This is a list of flag bearers who have represented Israel at the Paralympics

See also
 List of flag bearers for Israel at the Olympics

References

Flag bearers
Paralympics Flag bearers
Israel